John William Chisholm  is a British medical doctor who works as a general practitioner (GP). Chisholm was chairman of the British Medical Association's General Practitioners' Committee (GPC) between 1997 and 2007.

Early life
Chisholm was educated at Clifton College, Bristol. He studied at Peterhouse College at the University of Cambridge, and Westminster Hospital Medical School.

Career
Chisholm is a GP in Twyford, Berkshire.

He became a member of the GP committee of the BMA in 1977, then was elected joint deputy chair in 1991 which he held until being elected chair in 1997.

He is a member of BMA’s council. He is a vice-president of the BMA. He was the lead negotiator for the 2004 GP contract.

He is a Council Trustee for the Royal College of General Practitioners, having been a member of the RCGP's council for more than fourteen years. He is the chair of the Men's Health Forum. He is the chair of the BMA's Medical Ethics Committee.

Honours and awards
He was awarded a Commander of the Most Excellent Order of the British Empire (CBE) in the Queen’s Birthday honours in 2000.

References

Living people
People educated at Clifton College
People from Henley-on-Thames
Alumni of Peterhouse, Cambridge
Alumni of Westminster Hospital Medical School
British general practitioners
Fellows of the Royal College of General Practitioners
Commanders of the Order of the British Empire
Year of birth missing (living people)